The American Security and Trust Company Building is a Neoclassical bank office in Washington, D.C., designed by the architectural firm of York and Sawyer. It was listed on the National Register of Historic Places in 1973.

Design
The neoclassical exterior closely matches that of the Riggs National Bank building next door, also designed by York and Sawyer and completed in 1902, so that they are sometimes taken to be a single building. The east facade of the building presents a multiple bay arrangement with two plain bays flanking a hexastyle portico of six Ionic columns and entablature, while the narrower and plainer south face has a single bay with two plain Doric pilasters flanking the entrance in a shallow recess. The parapet conceals three skylights. Although the exterior has two rows of windows, the interior is in fact a single floor, also decorated in the neoclassical style; it was remodeled in 1931–1932 but retained essentially the same form excepting the removal of a pair of balconies and new openings into the adjoining annex which was constructed at the same time to the north. A basement floor formerly contained vaults, but with the construction of the annex these were moved to the adjoining building. The building exterior is constructed of granite ashlars with deep horizontal joints at the corners creating a striped effect; the interior is largely faced in a variety of marbles.

History

American Security Bank was founded in 1889 in Alexandria, Virginia, as a banking and trust concern, operating a branch in the District of Columbia at 1419 G Street, NW; the following year it reincorporated in the District a butt moved to 1405 G Street. Its president was Charles James Bell (Dublin, April 12, 1858 – October 1, 1929), nephew of Alexander Graham Bell.  It was the second trust company established in the District and the first to offer a woman's department. By 1903 business had grown to the extent that a new location was once again sought. The present location (a block from Lafayette Square and part of the Lafayette Square Historic District) was selected, and construction began in 1904. The design was praised in the banking press, and it was featured in The American Architect and Building News in 1905.

The building now houses a branch of Bank of America as a result of the latter's merger with NationsBank, which purchased MNC Financial in 1993. MNC had purchased American Security Bank in 1987 but continued to operate it under the original name.

Due to its location immediately north of the Treasury Building the building appeared on the back of the ten dollar bill for many years, a fact exploited in advertising with the slogan "right on the money."

See also

 National Register of Historic Places listings in Washington, D.C.

References

Commercial buildings completed in 1905
Bank of America buildings
Bank buildings on the National Register of Historic Places in Washington, D.C.
Neoclassical architecture in Washington, D.C.
1905 establishments in Washington, D.C.